A Sporting Chance is a lost 1919 American silent comedy film directed by George Melford and written by Will M. Ritchey based upon a story by Roger Hartman. The film stars Ethel Clayton, Jack Holt, Herbert Standing, Anna Q. Nilsson, and Howard Davies. The film was released on July 13, 1919, by Paramount Pictures.

A competing film with the title A Sporting Chance directed by Henry King opened a few days earlier.

Plot
As described in a film magazine, Carey Brent (Clayton), berated by her father Peter Brent (Standing) for yielding to impulses that lead to minor disasters, disobeys him in deciding to employ an escaping convict Paul Sayre (Holt) as a chauffeur, thus aiding him in eluding officers. In this capacity he keeps careful watch over her as she seeks to rid her stepmother of what she believes to be the dangerous attentions of Ralph Seward (Davies), who is seemingly favored by that lady. Wishing to spare her father pain, she wins the man over from Mrs. Brent (Nilsson), only to eventually discover that he is a blackmailer seeking to dispose of innocent though incriminating letters written by her stepmother when a young and romantic girl. Carey goes to his apartments in his absence to find the letters, but Seward's arrival traps her. At the critical moment the convict-chauffeur breaks in, whips Seward, recovers the letters, and effects Carey's escape. When he arrives home later, Carey warns him of a bulletin she has seen announcing the capture of himself. It turns out that he is a salesman whom the convict had forced to exchange clothes with him. Carey and Paul are married.

Cast
Ethel Clayton as Carey Brent
Jack Holt as Paul Sayre
Herbert Standing as Peter Brent
Anna Q. Nilsson as Pamela Brent
Howard Davies as Ralph Seward

References

External links 

Lantern slide at silenthollywood.com

1919 films
1910s English-language films
Silent American comedy films
1919 comedy films
Paramount Pictures films
Films directed by George Melford
American black-and-white films
Lost American films
American silent feature films
1919 lost films
Lost comedy films
1910s American films
English-language comedy films